Baeckea pentagonantha is a species of flowering plant in the family Myrtaceae and is endemic to near-coastal areas in the west of Western Australia. It is found on sand plains and river flats in the coastal parts of the Mid West region of Western Australia centred around Geraldton where it grows in sandy soils.

Baeckea pentagonantha was first formally described by Ferdinand von Mueller in 1864 in his book Fragmenta Phytographiae Australiae from specimens collected by Augustus Oldfield near the Murchison River.

See also
List of Baeckea species

References

Flora of Western Australia
pentagonantha
Plants described in 1864
Taxa named by Ferdinand von Mueller